Tritonia deusta is a plant species in the family Iridaceae, indigenous to the Western Cape Province, South Africa.

References

Iridaceae
Renosterveld